The discography of Joey DeFrancesco consists of twenty-nine studio albums on Columbia Records, Muse Records, Big Mo Records, Concord Records, HighNote Records, Concord Jazz, and Doodlin' Records.

Discography

Studio albums

As sideman

Discographies of American artists
Jazz discographies